Bain Gojri is a village of Abbottabad District in Khyber Pakhtunkhwa province of Pakistan. Neighbouring settlements include Patian, Bagwal Bandi and Saliot.

References

Populated places in Abbottabad District